The 2010 Abu Dhabi GP2 round was a GP2 Series motor race held on November 12–14, 2010 at the Yas Marina Circuit, Abu Dhabi, in the United Arab Emirates. It was the tenth and final round of the 2010 GP2 Season. The race was used to support the 2010 Abu Dhabi Grand Prix.

This race was the last for the Dallara GP2/08 chassis that was introduced in 2008 and also for Bridgestone as the sole tyre supplier for the GP2 Series and Formula One. Pirelli was also chosen as the sole tyre supplier for GP2 and Formula One from 2011.

Classification

Qualifying

Notes
 – Dani Clos, Jules Bianchi, Pastor Maldonado, Sam Bird, Jérôme d’Ambrosio and Giedo van der Garde were handed ten grid position penalties after failing to heed the pitlane red light at the end of the qualifying session.

Feature Race

Sprint Race

Standings after the round

Drivers' Championship standings

Teams' Championship standings

 Note: Only the top five positions are included for both sets of standings.

References

External links
 GP2 Series official web site: Results

Yas Marina
Yas Marina Gp2 Round, 2010
Motorsport competitions in the United Arab Emirates